The Hazuri Bagh Baradari is a baradari of white marble located in the Hazuri Bagh of Lahore, Pakistan. It was built by Maharaja Ranjit Singh, the Sikh ruler of Punjab to celebrate his capture of the Koh-i-Noor diamond from Shuja Shah Durrani in 1813. Its construction was completed in 1818.

The pillars support delicate cusped arches. The central area, where Maharaja Ranjit Singh held court, has a mirrored ceiling. The pavilion consisted of two storeys until it was damaged by lightning in 1932.

Images

References

External links

A photo of the Hazuri Bagh Baradari

Architecture of Lahore
Buildings and structures in Lahore
Walled City of Lahore
Sikh architecture
Buildings and structures completed in 1818
Ranjit Singh